Minster is a town on the north coast of the Isle of Sheppey in the Minster-on-Sea. This place is also in parish and the Swale district of Kent, south-east England. 17,389 Population [2021] – Census.

Toponymy
The name of the town derives from the monastery founded in the area. There is some variation in the use of the name, with the local parish council being named Minster-on-Sea, while other sources, such as the local primary school, use Minster-in-Sheppey, in order to distinguish it from Minster-in-Thanet, also in the county of Kent. Both places are listed in the Ordnance Survey gazetteer as Minster. Royal Mail identifies a locality of Minster on Sea in the ME12 postcode district. Minster-on-Sea is a location mentioned in Dickens's The Old Curiosity Shop.

Geography
The coast here consists of London Clay, and many fossil remains can be found along the beach after the waves have brought down the cliffs.

Religious sites

In around AD 670 King Ecgberht of Kent gave land at Minster for his mother Seaxburh of Ely to establish a Benedictine nunnery which was burnt down by the Danes in 855. At some point before the Norman invasion the church was rebuilt and refounded as a Benedictine nunnery, incorporating elements of the original construction in the north chancel and nave. Between 1123 and 1139 Archbishop Corbeil (Corbeuil) refounded it as an Augustinian nunnery. Corbeil is thought to be responsible for the unusual "semi-detached" arrangement of two churches next to each other, the Saxon church of the convent to the north and a parish church to the south for the villagers. They share a wall containing pointed arches and are now used as a single building. The abbey was dissolved in 1539 and along with Davington Priory near Faversham it came into the possession of Sir Thomas Cheney (Cheyney/Cheyne), a favourite of Anne Boleyn. He died in 1558 and was first buried in the chapel of Saint Katherine, which was demolished to allow construction of the east end of the chancel in 1581.

Today the remains of the old abbey gatehouse are a museum and the remaining tower is being restored.

Burials at the abbey
Roger Northwode
Sir Robert de Shurland
Thomas Cheney

History
In the early 20th century the island was hit by speculative builders and Minster suffered equally with Sheerness. After the Second World War the population of the village had swollen "from about 250 people in 100 homes to 5,500 people in 1,800 homes". (taken from the external link)

During the Second World War the Shoeburyness Boom, which ran across the Thames Estuary to protect shipping from submarine attack, ran from Royal Oak Point (near Minster) to Shoeburyness in Essex.  A similar structure was built along the same alignment in the early 1950s to protect against Soviet submarines.  The Royal Oak Point end of the boom was demolished in the 1960s.

Education
Oasis Academy Isle of Sheppey is located over two sites in the area, and is the only secondary school on the Isle of Sheppey. In 2009 eleven pupils were hurt by the collapse of a heating duct during an exam at its predecessor, Minster College.

Minster Cricket Club

Minster Cricket Club play at Gilbert Hall near St. George's Primary School. The club was established in 1931 and is the largest on the Isle of Sheppey, fielding four senior teams for Saturday league cricket. The club also have a junior section with U16, U14, U12. Also U1 & U8 soft ball teams, two midweek cricket teams and a Sunday team. www.minstercricket.co.uk

Amenities
In January 2014 a Micropub, The Heritage, opened in the High Street of Halfway Houses, near Minster, in premises previously used as a post office.

References

External links

Abbey website

Towns in Kent
Populated coastal places in Kent
Beaches of Kent
Isle of Sheppey